This is a list of Television in South Korea related events from 2017.

Ongoing

Animation

New Series & Returning Shows

Drama

Animation

Ending

Drama

Animation

References

2017 in South Korean television